Tom (Thomas John) Lewis (born 1943) is a British singer and writer of nautical songs.

His most famous song, "The Last Shanty (A Sailor Ain't A Sailor)," has been recorded by over 30 different groups around the world.

Biography
Lewis was born in Belfast, Northern Ireland and grew up in Gloucester, England. He served in the Royal Navy from 1959 until 1983, mostly in the (diesel) Submarine Service.

He developed his interest in sea shanties while frequenting the Howff Folk Song Club of Dunfermline, Scotland, in the 1960s, and began to perform at clubs and festivals in his off-time. On completing his naval service, he emigrated to Salmo, British Columbia, Canada, "to be somewhere completely different to a large port city." In 1987, he began to record and to tour, due to popular demand.

Recordings
Lewis' first solo album, issued in 1987, was Surfacing and included two early favorites among his recordings, "The Last Shanty" and "Marching Inland."  Those two songs later appeared on the compilation CD, A Taste of the Maritimes (1992), the former tune under the title "A Sailor Ain't a Sailor." In 1988 he recorded and toured with William Pint and Felicia Dale. Currently much of his touring happens in the U.K and Europe, giving him more opportunities to perform with his Polish compatriots (QFTRY).

His albums have been favorably reviewed in Dirty Linen magazine, Living Tradition magazine and Sing Out! magazine. (The latter calling his song "Radio Times" the "folk equivalent of 'American Pie.'") His songs have also been played on The Midnight Special folk music radio show.

In 2000, he won the Stan Hugill International Trophy when the competition was held in Douarnenez, France.

In 2008, he published his tunes and lyrics as Worth the Singin': the Tom Lewis Songbook.

Since 2015 he has been Festival Patron of the Gloucester Shanty Festival.

Discography
Surfacing (1987)
Sea-Dog, See Dog! (1990)
Making Waves (1992), with William Pint and Felicia Dale
Tinker, Tailor, Soldier, Sailor Singer! (1995)
Mixed Cargo (1999)
Poles Apart (Polish Title: On, My Ocean) (2001) with a five-man shanty group from Poland (QFTRY).  In English and Polish.
360° All Points of the Compass (2003)
The Song Goes On (2011) Poles Part Too with QFTRY
Demand Performance (2020) Double-CD: Seven (extended, 'live) stage performances, plus eleven new studio recordings.

References

External links
Tom Lewis' website.
Borealis Recordings page for Tom Lewis
"Seafaring Folk on Trio's Debut," by Mike Joyce. The Washington Post, 19 June 1992, page WW16.  (Favorable review of Tom Lewis, William Pint, and Felicia Dale album, Making Waves.

1943 births
Living people
Musicians from Belfast
Canadian folk singers
Canadian male singers
Canadian songwriters
Royal Navy sailors
Maritime music